The Sunflower Bowl was a National Association of Intercollegiate Athletics post-season college football bowl game played in Winfield, Kansas from 1982 to 1986.

Game results

See also
 List of college bowl games

References

Defunct college football bowls
American football in Kansas